Anne Katherine "Kathy" Grieb (born June 3, 1949) is an American biblical scholar and Episcopal priest. She has taught New Testament at Virginia Theological Seminary since 1994, and is currently Meade Professor in Biblical Interpretation. She previously taught at Bangor Theological Seminary in Maine.

She has a B.A. in Philosophy and Religion from Hollins University and a J.D. from Columbus School of Law at the Catholic University of America.  She has also earned a M.Div. from Virginia Theological Seminary and has a Ph.D. in Religious Studies from Yale University. Ordained to the diaconate and priesthood in the Episcopal Diocese of Washington in 1983.

Bibliography

To Set Our Hope on Christ: A Response to the Invitation of Windsor Report Paragraph 135, (The Office of Communication, the Episcopal Church Center, New York, 2005)

See also
Virginia Theological Seminary
List of Virginia Theological Seminary people

References

External links
Personal website
Virginia Theological Seminary TS website

1949 births
Living people
Writers from Alexandria, Virginia
People from Easton, Maryland
Hollins University alumni
Columbus School of Law alumni
Yale University alumni
20th-century American theologians
American biblical scholars
American Episcopal priests
Virginia Theological Seminary faculty
Women theologians
21st-century American theologians
Writers from Maryland
21st-century American women writers
American women non-fiction writers
20th-century American women
American women academics
Female biblical scholars